The Albury & District Football League was established at a delegates meeting in Culcairn in 1930 from the following Australian Rules Football clubs - Albury Rovers, Culcairn, Henty and Holbrook and folded after the 1957 football season.

History
The Albury & District Football League was established at a delegates meeting in Culcairn in 1930 from the following Australian Rules Football clubs - Albury Rovers, Culcairn, Henty and Holbrook. The first season saw 12 games played, plus semi finals and a grand final which was won by Henty.

Brocklesby had a famous grand final victory over Henty to win the 1939 Albury & District Football League premiership after Wally Crooks kicked a goal after the siren, from a free kick to win by two points, under captain / coach, Jim Steigenberger. Henty then lodged an appeal to the Albury & DFL, which was defeated then appealed to the Murray District Football Council, which was then upheld, awarding the premiership to Henty. Brocklesby then appealed that decision to the Victorian Country Football League, which was up held, allowing Brocklesby to finally be declared the 1939 premiers. Brocklesby's full forward, Shadrach "Shady" James kicked 82 goals in the home and away series plus 16 goals in the finals, for a total of 98 goals in 17 games in 1939.

In August 1943, Mr. A D S Vivian, the league's foundation President from 1930 to 1935 passed away in Sydney. Vivian was the driving force behind the Albury Rovers FC and a former club President too. He was the Vice President of the NSW branch of the National Football League.

In 1950 the Albury & District Football League introduced a Reserve Grade Competition,

North Melbourne visited Bolton Park, Wagga in 1952 and defeated a combined Albury & DFL side, with North's Jock Spencer kicking 18 goals.

The 1952 A&DFL Reserves competition was divided into two division – North (Wagga) and South (Albury).

Culcairn's Henry "Splinter" Liston licked 91 goals in the 1953 home and away series, plus 8 more in the finals, to finish on 99 goals!

In June 1954 the Albury & DFL played an inter-league match against the South Western DFL at Wagga, resulting in a win to Albury & DFL, 12.20 - 92 to 10.7 - 67.

Culcairn's Henry "Splinter" Liston kicked 102 goals in 1954, which included the finals series.

In 1955, Ron Clegg was captain-coach of the North Wagga Football Club in the Albury & DFL, winning the £50 - Border Mail Newspaper / Albury & DFL Footballer of the Year Award, before returning to South Melbourne in 1956.

In 1957 the Farrer Football League was first formed as a breakaway from the Albury & District Football League. Culcairn, Henty, Holbrook and Mangoplah-Cookardinia United competed in the first season. In 1958 all remaining clubs from the Albury & District Football League moved across to the Farrer Football League.

Former Clubs
 Albury Catholic Young Men's Club (CYMC): 1934. The club changed its name to St. Patrick's FC in 1935.  
 Albury Rovers: 1930 - 1940, 1946. Joined in 1930, after being runners up to Granya in the 1929 Tallangatta & District Football League. Merged with East Albury in 1947 to form East Albury Rovers.  
 Brocklesby: 1931 - 32, (1933 & 34 - Central Hume Football Association), 1935 - 40. Initially joined from the Riverina Football Association in 1931. Joined the Hume Football League in 1945 and played there until 2005.
 Cookardinia: 1934 - 1940, 1946 - 1954. Mangoplah and Cookardinia football clubs decide to merge prior to the 1955 season.   
 Culcairn: 1930 - 1940, 1946 - 1956. Joined the Farrer Football League in 1957 & played there until 1991. Initially joined from the Riverina Football Association in 1930.
 East Albury Rovers:1947. Joined the Hume Football League in 1948. and folded in 1951.
 Henty: 1930 - 1940, 1946 - 1956. Joined the Farrer Football League in 1957 & played there until 1979. Initially joined from the Riverina Football Association in 1930.
 Holbrook: 1930 - 1940, 1946 - 1956. Joined the Farrer Football League in 1957 & played there until 1980. Initially joined from the Riverina Football Association in 1930. 
 Mangoplah: 1937 - 1940, 1946 - 1954. Mangoplah and Cookardinia football clubs decide to merge prior to the 1955 season.
 Mangoplah / Cookardinia United: 1955 & 1956. Joined the Farrer Football League in 1957 & played there until 1981.
 Marrar: 1952 - 1956. Played in the A&DFL Seconds competition. Joined the Central Riverina Football League in 1957.
 North Wagga: 1950 - 1957. Joined the Riverina Football League in 1958 after a merger with the North Wagga Stars FC.
 Rand: 1939 - 1940. Joined the Hume Football League in 1945 and played there until 1983.
 RAAF 2nds: 1950 - 
 St. Patrick's: 1935 & 1936. Club disbanded in April, 1937. 
 The Rock: 1938 - 1940. (Played in the Milbrulong & District League from 1945 - 1947), 1948 - 1957. 
 Turvey Park 2nds: 1953 & 1954. Joined the Farrer Football League in 1958. 
 Wagga: 1949 - 1957. Joined the Farrer Football League in 1958 & played there until 1959.
 Woomargama / Mullengandra: 1948. The club withdrew in 1949 and went into recess.
(Albury & DFL went into recess between 1941 & 1945 due to WW2)

Grand Finals
Seniors

 MCU - Mangoplah Cookardinia United FC
 Cannon Cup: Donated by John Cannon from the Culcairn Hotel.

Most Senior Premierships / Runners Up

Reserves
The Albury & DFL Reserves competition ran from 1950 to 1957.

League Best & Fairest Award
 In 1932, Mr. D M Stavley of Wodonga donated a medal for the best and fairest player to be decided on by the umpires votes.
 The Carlton Brewery Medal was first donated in 1936. 
 The Baz Medal was first donated in 1952 by Mr. Mick Baz of Culcairn. 

 1938 - Albert Clay (Henty) lost on a count back.
 1950 - Brian Brennan (Holbrook) lost on a count back.
 1952 - Tim Robb (The Rock) lost on a count back.

VFL Players

The following footballers from the Albury & DFL went onto to play senior VFL football, with the year indicating their VFL debut.
 1934 - Dinny Ryan - Albury Rovers to Fitzroy
 1940 - Albert Clay - Henty to Fitzroy
 1940 - Shadrach "Shady" James - Brocklesby to Fitzroy
 1941 - Ivor Clay - Henty to Fitzroy
 1950 - Neale Rutzou - Wagga to Fitzroy
 1957 - Bill Byrne - Mangoplah / Cookardinia United to Melbourne

Office Bearers

Links
1930 to 1956 - Albury & District Football League Premierships & Best & Fairest Lists
1937 - Albury & DFL Premiers: Henty FC team photo
1938 - Albury & DFL team: Holbrook FC team photo
1939 - Albury & DFL team: Rand FC team photo
1939 – Mangoplah FC & The Rock FC team photos
1939 - Albury & DFL semi final team: Brocklesby FC team photo
1939 - Albury & DFL semi Final team: Henty FC team photo
1940 – Albury & DFL Premiers: Mangoplah FC team photo
1947 - Albury & DFL team: Cookardinia FC team photo
1947 - Albury & DFL team: Culcairn FC team photo
1947 - Albury & DFL Runners Up: Holbrook FC team photo
1948 - Albury & DFL grand final teams: Mangoplah FC & The Rock FC team photos
1949 - Albury & DFL Premiers: Mangoplah FC team photo
1950 - Albury & DFL Runners Up: Holbrook FC team photo
1951 - Albury & DFL Premiers: Holbrook FC team photo
1951 - Albury & DFL Runners Up: Culcairn FC team photo
1952 - Albury & DFL Premiers: Culcairn FC team photo
1953 - Albury & DFL Premiers: Culcairn FC team photo
The Farrer Football Netball League
Riverina Football Association
South West Football League (New South Wales)
Australian rules football in New South Wales

References

Australian rules football in Australia
Defunct Australian rules football competitions in New South Wales
Sport in the Riverina
Sports leagues established in 1930
1930 establishments in Australia
1957 disestablishments in Australia